Aamer Hameed (born 18 October 1954, in Lahore, Punjab) is a former Pakistani cricketer, known as The Lahori Lion who played two ODIs between 1977 and 1978. His primary skill was a fast-medium pace bowler. Both his international matches came against England during the 1977/78 home series. He only picked up one wicket in his two games dismissing Mike Brearley at the Zafar Ali Stadium. He was picked for the summer tour of England in 1978 although he didn't receive a call-up during the series and eventually was never considered for international selection for the remainder of his career. After the Tour of England 1978, he went for his further studies and joined University College, Oxford, England. Here, he played for Oxford University and won his Oxford Blue in 1979. Additionally, he had also played for the Oxbridge Cricket Club during this time.

References 

1954 births
Living people
Pakistan One Day International cricketers
Pakistani cricketers
Pakistan Universities cricketers
Lahore A cricketers
Punjab A cricketers
Service Industries cricketers
National Bank of Pakistan cricketers
Oxford University cricketers
Punjab (Pakistan) cricketers
British Universities cricketers
Cricketers from Lahore
Alumni of University College, Oxford